Akshara Singh is an Indian actress who is primarily active in Bhojpuri films and, is a recipient of several awards. Singh is known for her roles in films like action drama Tabadala, political drama Sarkar Raj and action romance Satya. She is one of the highest-paid actresses in Bhojpuri cinema.

Career
Singh made her acting debut opposite Ravi Kishan in the 2010 action drama Satyamev Jayate. She subsequently appeared in 2011 family drama Pran Jaye Par Vachan Na Jaye. Singh also appeared in the 2016 romantic drama A Balma Bihar Wala opposite Khesari Lal Yadav and in 2017 Action Drama Satya, Tabadla, Maa Tujhe Salaam opposite Pawan Singh.

Singh first appeared in Hindi television in 2015 on Kaala Teeka and Service Wali Bahu on Zee TV. Singh subsequently played the role of Gandhari in the Indian historical epic Suryaputra Karn and Kadika for the historical show Porus on Sony TV.

Filmography

Films

Television

See also

 Bhojpuri cinema
List of Bhojpuri actresses

References

External links

 

Living people
Actresses in Bhojpuri cinema
21st-century Indian actresses
Actresses from Mumbai
Bigg Boss (Hindi TV series) contestants
1993 births